Sir Bysshe Shelley, 1st Baronet (21 June 1731 – 6 January 1815) was the grandfather of English Romantic poet Percy Bysshe Shelley.

Life

Shelley was born in Newark, Essex County, Province of New Jersey (present-day United States) on 21 June 1731. He became rich and influential due to a combination of marriages to women from other influential families and his own family's wealth. In the 1790s, following the death of his second wife, he built a magnificent country house, Castle Goring, which he intended to be the family seat.  He was created 1st Baronet Shelley, of Castle Goring, Sussex. He died in 1815 at the age of 83.

Personal life

Sir Bysshe was married twice; firstly on 30 June 1752 to Mary Catherine Michell (b. 1734 in Sussex, England), the daughter of Theobald and Mary Michell; and secondly to Elizabeth Jane Perry on 17 August 1769.

Child from first marriage:
 Timothy Shelley (7 September 1753 – 24 April 1844); later Sir Timothy Shelley, 2nd Baronet of Castle Goring

Child from second marriage:
 John Shelley Sidney (18 December 1771 – 14 March 1849); later Sir John Shelley-Sidney, 1st Baronet of Penshurst Place
 Algernon Bysshe Shelley (May 1781 – December 1781)

Ancestry 
Henry Shelley became father to the younger Henry Shelley. This younger Henry had at least three sons. The youngest of them, Richard Shelley was born in 1583, and baptized 17November 1583 in Warminghurst, Sussex, England. Richard later married on 3February 1601 in Itchingfield to Jonne (aka Joane) Feste/Feest/Fuste, daughter of John Feest/Fuste from Itchingfield, near Horsham, West Sussex. Their grandson, John Shelley of Fen Place, Turners Hill, West Sussex, was married to Helen Bysshe, daughter of Roger Bysshe. Their son Timothy Shelley of Fen Place (born c.1700) married widow Johanna Plum from New York City. Timothy and Johanna were the great-grandparents of Percy.

Ancestry chart

References

1731 births
1815 deaths
Baronets in the Baronetage of the United Kingdom
Shelley baronets, of Castle Goring